Janulus is a genus of air-breathing land snails, terrestrial pulmonate gastropod mollusks in the family Gastrodontidae.

Species 
Species within the genus Janulus include:
 Janulus pompylius

References

 Nomenclator Zoologicus info

 
Gastrodontidae